James Squires may refer to:

 James Squire (1754–1822), or Squires, convict transported to Australia and brewer
 James A. Squires, American railroad executive
 James Radcliffe Squires (1917–1993), American poet, writer, critic, and academic